The Call Baronetcy, of Whiteford in the County of Cornwall, was a title in the Baronetage of Great Britain. It was created on 28 July 1791 for John Call, Member of Parliament for Callington from 1784 to 1801. He was succeeded by his son William, the second Baronet. He served as High Sheriff of Cornwall. His son and successor, William, the third Baronet, was also High Sheriff of Cornwall. The title became extinct on the death of the latter's son, the fourth Baronet, in 1903.

Call baronets, of Whiteford (1791)
Sir John Call, 1st Baronet (1732–1801)
Sir William Pratt Call, 2nd Baronet (1781–1851)
Sir William Berkeley Call, 3rd Baronet (1815–1864)
Sir William George Montagu Call, 4th Baronet (1849–1903)

Notes

References

Extinct baronetcies in the Baronetage of Great Britain